Asuni is a comune (municipality) in the Province of Oristano in the Italian region Sardinia, located about  north of Cagliari and about  east of Oristano.

Asuni borders the following municipalities: Laconi, Ruinas, Samugheo, Senis, Villa Sant'Antonio.

Demographic evolution

References

Cities and towns in Sardinia
Articles which contain graphical timelines